The 1958 Major League Baseball season was played from April 14 to October 15, 1958. It was the first season of play in California for both the Los Angeles Dodgers (formerly of Brooklyn) and the San Francisco Giants (formerly of New York City); this marked the first teams to be played on the West Coast. Three teams had relocated earlier in the decade: the Milwaukee Braves, Baltimore Orioles, and Kansas City Athletics. New York went without a National League team for four seasons, until the expansion New York Mets began play in 1962.

Awards and honors

Most Valuable Player:
AL: Jackie Jensen, Boston Red Sox
NL: Ernie Banks, Chicago Cubs
Cy Young Award: Bob Turley, New York Yankees
Rookie of the Year:
AL: Albie Pearson, Washington Senators
NL: Orlando Cepeda, San Francisco Giants
Gold Glove Award
Bobby Shantz (P) New York Yankees (AL) 
Sherm Lollar (C) Chicago White Sox (AL) 
Vic Power (1B) Cleveland Indians (AL) 
Nellie Fox (2B) Chicago White Sox (AL) 
Frank Malzone (3B) Boston Red Sox (AL) 
Luis Aparicio (SS) Chicago White Sox (AL) 
Minnie Miñoso (OF) Cleveland Indians (AL) 
Al Kaline (OF) Detroit Tigers (AL) 
Norm Siebern (OF) New York Yankees (AL)

MLB statistical leaders

Standings

American League

National League

Postseason

Bracket

Managers

American League

National League

Home Field Attendance

Events

January–March
January 29 – Los Angeles Dodgers catcher Roy Campanella suffers a broken neck in an early morning auto accident on Long Island. His spinal column is nearly severed and his legs are permanently paralyzed. Campanella will never play for the Dodgers after their move to Los Angeles, although a newspaper story (showing a picture of him wearing a Brooklyn cap) describes him as being of the Los Angeles Dodgers.
February 4 – The Baseball Hall of Fame fails to elect any new members for the first time since 1950.

April–June
April 15 – In the first Major League Baseball game played on the West Coast, Rubén Gómez of the San Francisco Giants hurls an 8–0 shutout against the Los Angeles Dodgers. Giants' shortstop Daryl Spencer hits the first Major League home run on the Pacific Coast. A park-record 23,192 fans pack San Francisco's Seals Stadium to witness the historic game.
April 25 – The Dodgers set a record for the most fans at a regular season night game as 60,635 fans are on hand to see the Dodgers defeat the St. Louis Cardinals 5–3.
May 13 – Stan Musial of the St. Louis Cardinals gets his 3,000th career hit, a pinch-hit double off Moe Drabowsky in the sixth inning of a 5–3 Cardinals victory over the Chicago Cubs at Wrigley Field.
May 23 – Willie Mays hits his 200th career home run, a two-run shot off Warren Spahn in the ninth inning of a game against the Milwaukee Braves at County Stadium. The home run drives in the decisive runs of the game, as the San Francisco Giants down the Braves, 5–3.

July–September
September 14 – The New York Yankees sweep a doubleheader against the Kansas City Athletics, 5–3 and 12–7 (14 innings), clinching their fourth straight American League pennant.
September 20 – Hoyt Wilhelm of the Baltimore Orioles strikes out eight while throwing a no-hitter against the New York Yankees.
September 21 – The Milwaukee Braves clinch their second consecutive National League pennant with a 6–5 victory over the Cincinnati Reds, thus ensuring a Yankees-Braves World Series for the second straight year.

October–December
October 8 – The New York Yankees win the 1958 World Series handily as Moose Skowron's 3-run home run off Milwaukee Braves pitcher Lew Burdette in the 8th inning puts Game 7 on ice, 6–2. The Yankees became only the second team to come back from a 3–1 deficit to win a best-of-seven World Series, joining the Pittsburgh Pirates, who did it in the 1925 World Series. (The Boston Americans/Red Sox came back from a 3–1 deficit to win the first World Series in 1903, a best-of-nine series.) Milwaukee's Eddie Mathews strikes out for the 11th time, a record that will stand until 1980, when broken by Willie Wilson of the Kansas City Royals. The Braves' 53 strikeouts are also a new World Series record. This is Casey Stengel's 7th world championship, tying him with Joe McCarthy for the most Series won.

Movies
Damn Yankees

Births
January 20 – Bill Scherrer
February 21 – Alan Trammell
April 29 – Steve Crawford
June 15 – Wade Boggs
August 19 – Gary Gaetti
August 23- Julio Franco
September 16 – Orel Hershiser
November 28 – Dave Righetti
December 25 – Rickey Henderson

Deaths
January 23 – Walter Lonergan, 72, shortstop for the 1911 Boston Red Sox
March 28 – Chuck Klein, 53, slugging right fielder, primarily with the Philadelphia Phillies, who was named the NL's MVP in 1932 and won the Triple Crown one year later; the 7th player to hit 300 home runs, winning four league titles
April 14 – John Freeman, 57, outfielder for the 1927 Boston Red Sox
June 9 – John Fick, 37, pitcher for the 1944 Philadelphia Blue Jays
August 1 – Ike Boone, 61, an outfielder for the New York Giants, Boston Red Sox, Chicago White Sox, and Brooklyn Dodgers between 1922 and 1932, who posted an ML career average of .321, compiled a .370 BA for the highest minor league all-time, and set a professional baseball record in 1929 collecting 553 total bases while playing in the Pacific Coast League
November 21 – Mel Ott, 49, Hall of Fame outfielder and 12-time All-Star for the New York Giants who held National League career record for home runs (511), leading league 6 times
November 27 – Harry G. Salsinger, 71, sportswriter for the Detroit News for over 50 years
December 8 – Tris Speaker, 70, Hall of Fame center fielder known for spectacular defense as well as superlative batting, becoming the second player to compile over 3,500 hits and posting a .345 career average
December 31 – Jack Doyle, 89, 17 year playing career includes a one time stint as manager of the New York Giants.

See also
1958 Nippon Professional Baseball season

References

External links
1958 Major League Baseball season schedule

 
Major League Baseball seasons